Rogi  is a village in the administrative district of Gmina Miejsce Piastowe, within Krosno County, Subcarpathian Voivodeship, in south-eastern Poland.

The village has an approximate population of 2,500.

References

Rogi